Alpha-1,3-mannosyl-glycoprotein 4-beta-N-acetylglucosaminyltransferase B is an enzyme that in humans is encoded by the MGAT4B gene.

This gene encodes a key glycosyltransferase that regulates the formation of tri- and multiantennary branching structures in the Golgi apparatus. The encoded protein, in addition to the related isoenzyme A, catalyzes the transfer of N-acetylglucosamine (GlcNAc) from UDP-GlcNAc in a beta-1,4 linkage to the Man-alpha-1,3-Man-beta-1,4-GlcNAc arm of R-Man-alpha-1,6(GlcNAc-beta-1,2-Man-alpha-1,3)Man-beta-1,4-GlcNAc-beta-1,4-GlcNAc-beta-1-Asn. Therefore, the protein is essential for the production of tri- and tetra-antennary sugar chains. The encoded protein may play a role in regulating the availability of serum glycoproteins, oncogenesis, and differentiation. Its affinities for donors of acceptors are lower than that of MGAT4A so it is suggested that it is not the main contributor in N-glycan biosynthesis.

References

Further reading